Tías is a town and a municipality in the southern part of the island of Lanzarote, province of Las Palmas, autonomous community of the Canary Islands, Spain. The town Tías is situated 4 km from the south coast and 10 km west of the island capital Arrecife.

Lanzarote's largest tourist resort, Puerto del Carmen, is entirely in the municipality of Tías, and was the location of the first hotels ever built on the island. Other settlements in the municipality are Mácher, La Asomada, Conil, Masdache.

Notable residents 
The town of Tías is or has been home to:
 José Saramago, Portuguese writer, playwright and journalist, Nobel Prize for Literature 1998
 Alberto Vazquez-Figueroa, Spanish writer and novelist
 Helen Lindes, Spanish model, Miss Spain 2000 and runner-up to Miss Universe 2000
 Guillermina Fernández Díaz, born June 1902, the oldest Canary Island resident

Sister towns 
  Adeje, Spain
  Azinhaga, Portugal (birthplace of José Saramago)
  Castril, Spain
  Llanes, Spain

See also 
 List of municipalities in Las Palmas

References

External links 

Municipalities in Lanzarote
Populated places in Lanzarote